José Carlos Bernardo (28 April 1945 – 12 June 2018), known as Zé Carlos, was a Brazilian footballer. He played in four matches for the Brazil national football team from 1968 to 1975. He was also part of Brazil's squad for the 1975 Copa América tournament.

References

External links
 

1945 births
2018 deaths
Brazilian footballers
Brazil international footballers
Association footballers not categorized by position